Alfredo Sánchez Cruz (born March 23, 1987) is a Mexican former midfielder. He last played for F.C. Atlas, in the Liga MX.

Alfredo made his debut on April 1, 2006, in a 3–1 loss to Dorados de Sinaloa, without having played for Atlas' filial team, Académicos. He was later sent down to the Primera A for more playing time. He then played in the Segunda Division (Second Division) for Atlético Cihuatlán. Eventually, he made his way back to Atlas, where his best season was the Apertura 2008 season. He played in 12 games, was a starter in half of them, logged 691 minutes of playing time, but albeit had no goals. However, he did earn an assist in a 4–2 loss to Cruz Azul.

External links
 

1987 births
Living people
Liga MX players
Atlas F.C. footballers
Association football midfielders
People from Apatzingán
Footballers from Michoacán
Mexican footballers